The Orchid is a 1905 novel by American writer Robert Grant.

Plot introduction
A headstrong young woman marries for money and divorces for love. She then sells her infant daughter back to her former husband to secure a two million dollar fortune.

References

1905 American novels